The Lakewood School District is a comprehensive community public school district that serves students in pre-kindergarten through twelfth grade in Lakewood Township in Ocean County, New Jersey, United States.

As of the 2018–19 school year, the district, comprising eight schools, had an enrollment of 6,767 students and 492.5 classroom teachers (on an FTE basis), for a student–teacher ratio of 13.7:1.

History 

The school district provided busing to 18,000 students enrolled at 74 yeshivas as of 2011, which by 2016 had grown to a private school population of 25,000, more than quadruple the number of public school students.

In March 2017, Superintendent Laura Winters stated that due to a proposed $14.7 million decrease of the district budget, the district would be "unable to provide students with a thorough and efficient education required by the New Jersey State Constitution." The proposed cuts may cause 120 teachers to lose their positions.

Demographics
As of 2017, most of the students are black and Latino/Hispanic, while many of the Orthodox Jewish town residents send their children to private Jewish schools.

Schools 
Schools in the district (with 2018–19 enrollment data from the National Center for Education Statistics) are:
Preschool
Lakewood Early Childhood Center with 206 students in PreK
Heni Mozes, Supervisor of Early Childhood Center
Elementary schools
Ella G. Clarke School with 606 students in grades 2-5
Debra Meabe, Principal

Clifton Avenue School with 365 students in grades 2-5
Debra Long, Principal

Oak Street School with 794 students in grades 1-5
Joseph Schroepfer, Principal

Piner Elementary School with 509 students in grades PreK-1
Marcy Marshall, Principal
Spruce Street School with 479 students in grades PreK-1
Aleida Salguero, Principal
Middle school
Lakewood Middle School with 1,334 students in grades 6-8
Richard Goldstein, Principal
High school
Lakewood High School with 1,243 students in grades 9-12
Ebony Rivera, Principal

Administration
Core members of the district's administration are:
Laura A. Winters, Superintendent of Schools
Vacant, Business Administrator / Board Secretary

Board of education
The district's board of education, with nine members, sets policy and oversees the fiscal and educational operation of the district through its administration. As a Type II school district, the board's trustees are elected directly by voters to serve three-year terms of office on a staggered basis, with three seats up for election each year held (since 2013) as part of the November general election.

References

External links 
Lakewood School District

School Data for the Lakewood School District, National Center for Education Statistics

Lakewood Township, New Jersey
New Jersey District Factor Group none
School districts in Ocean County, New Jersey